A quarry is a type of open-pit mine in which dimension stone, rock, construction aggregate, riprap, sand, gravel, or slate is excavated from the ground. The operation of quarries is regulated in some jurisdictions to reduce their environmental impact.

The word quarry can also include the underground quarrying for stone, such as Bath stone.

Types of rock
Types of rock extracted from quarries include:
Chalk
China clay
Cinder
Clay
Coal
Construction aggregate (sand and gravel)
Coquina
Diabase
Gabbro
Granite
Gritstone
Gypsum
Limestone
Marble
Ores
Phosphate rock
Quartz
Sandstone
Slate
Travertine

Stone quarry 

Stone quarry is an outdated term for mining construction rocks (limestone, marble, granite, sandstone, etc.).  There are open types (called quarries, or open-pit mines) and closed types (mines and caves).

For thousands of years, only hand tools had been used in quarries.  In the 18th century, the use of drilling and blasting operations was mastered.

Methods of quarrying
The method of removal of stones from their natural bed by using different operations is called quarrying.  Methods of quarrying include:
a) Digging – This method is used when the quarry consists of small & soft pieces of stones. 
b) Heating – This method is used when the natural rock bed is horizontal and small in thickness. 
c) Wedging –This method is used when the hard rock consists of natural fissure. When natural fissures are absent then artificial fissures are prepared by drilling holes. 
d) Blasting – It is the process of removal of stones with the help of controlled explosives is filled in the holes of the stones. Line of least resistance plays very important role in the blasting process.

Following steps are used in the blasting process; 
1) Drilling holes – Blast holes are drilled by using drilling machines. 
2) Charging – Explosive powders are fed into the cleaned & dried blast holes. 
3) Tamping – The remaining portion of the blast holes are filled by clay, ash, fuse and wirings.
4) Firing –The fuses of blasting holes are fired by using electrical power supply or match sticks.

Slabs
Many quarry stones such as marble, granite, limestone, and sandstone are cut into larger slabs and removed from the quarry. The surfaces are polished and finished with varying degrees of sheen or luster. Polished slabs are often cut into tiles or countertops and installed in many kinds of residential and commercial properties. Natural stone quarried from the earth is often considered a luxury and tends to be a highly durable surface, thus highly desirable.

Problems

Quarries in level areas with shallow groundwater or which are located close to surface water often have engineering problems with drainage. Generally the water is removed by pumping while the quarry is operational, but for high inflows more complex approaches may be required.

To reduce surface leakage, a moat lined with clay was constructed around the entire quarry. Groundwater entering the pit is pumped up into the moat. As a quarry becomes deeper, water inflows generally increase and it also becomes more expensive to lift the water higher during removal; this can become the limiting factor in quarry depth. Some water-filled quarries are worked from beneath the water, by dredging.

Many people and municipalities consider quarries to be eyesores and require various abatement methods to address problems with noise, dust, and appearance. One of the more effective and famous examples of successful quarry restoration is Butchart Gardens in Victoria, British Columbia, Canada.

A further problem is pollution of roads from trucks leaving the quarries. To control and restrain the pollution of public roads, wheel washing systems are becoming more common.

Quarry lakes

Many quarries naturally fill with water after abandonment and become lakes. Others are made into landfills.

Water-filled quarries can be very deep, often  or more, and surprisingly cold, so swimming in quarry lakes is generally not recommended. Unexpectedly cold water can cause a swimmer's muscles to suddenly weaken; it can also cause shock and even hypothermia. Though quarry water is often very clear, submerged quarry stones, abandoned equipment, dead animals and strong currents make diving into these quarries extremely dangerous. Several people drown in quarries each year. However, many inactive quarries are converted into safe swimming sites.

Such lakes, even lakes within active quarries, can provide important habitat for animals.

See also

List of quarries
List of quarries in the United States
Clay pit
Coal mining
Collecting fossils
Fair Stone standard
Gravel pit
List of minerals
List of rock types
List of stones
Miner
Mountaintop removal mining
Opencast mining
Quarry lake
Quarries (biblical)

References

S.K Duggal "Building Materials" (2003) 3rd revised edition
Quarries

External links

Environmental impact of mining
 
Surface mining